Mataso is an island in the Shefa of Vanuatu in the Pacific Ocean. The island is a part of Shepherd Islands archipelago.

Geography
It is formed by two hills separated by white sandy beaches known as Matah Susum (Small Mataso) and Matah 'Ahlam (Big Mataso), so the island was as "Two Hills" by early explorers. The nearest islands are Makura and Emae. Mataso is widely known for its broad marine resources with rich coral reefs around the coast and a wide variety of game shipping options out on the open sea.

Population 
As of 2015, the island supports a population of about 61 in 12 households. The main settlement is Na'asang. The principal economic activity is subsistence agriculture  and Fisheries. The GDP of the island is $457 per capita. The island's language, also called Namakura, as its also used by parts of Emae, Makira, Buniga, Tongariki and parts of Tongoa. Many of the islanders now live in Port Vila by the area of Ohlen Mataso.

References 

Islands of Vanuatu
Shefa Province